Mohammed Ghulam (born 14 January 1982) is a cricketer who plays for the Kuwait national cricket team. He played in the 2013 ICC World Cricket League Division Six tournament.

References

External links
 

1982 births
Living people
Kuwaiti cricketers
Pakistani expatriates in Kuwait
Place of birth missing (living people)